UTC−02:00 is an identifier for a time offset from UTC of −02:00.

As daylight saving time (Northern Hemisphere summer)

North America
 Greenland
 Except areas around Danmarkshavn, Ittoqqortoormiit and Pituffik (Thule)
 France
 Saint Pierre and Miquelon

As standard time (year-round)

Atlantic Ocean
 Brazil
 Fernando de Noronha
 Trindade and Martin Vaz
 Rocas Atoll
 Saint Peter and Saint Paul Archipelago
 United Kingdom
 South Georgia and the South Sandwich Islands

Anomalies

Regions in UTC−03:00 longitudes using UTC−02:00 time 

 South Georgia and the South Sandwich Islands (United Kingdom)  
South Georgia Group  
The westernmost tip of South Georgia Island  
Shag Rocks  
Black Rock

Areas in UTC−02:00 longitudes using other time zones

Using UTC±00:00 

 The westernmost part of Iceland, including the northwest peninsula (the Westfjords) and its main town of Ísafjörður, which is west of 22°30'W

Using UTC−01:00 

 The westernmost part of legal UTC−01:00 area in Ittoqqortoormiit Municipality (East Greenland)
 Azores islands (Portugal)
 Cape Verde

Using UTC−03:00 

 The eastern part of Greenland, excluding legal UTC−1 area (westernmost part)
 The easternmost part of Northeast Region, Brazil

See also
Time in Brazil
Time in Denmark

References

External links

UTC offsets